Laxson may refer to:

People
 Ruth Laxson (1924–2019), American artist
 Shelby A. Laxson (1913–1982), American politician

Places
 Laxson Creek, Texas, United States